There are eight ships of the British Royal Navy that have been named HMS Edgar.

 , a 70-gun third rate launched in 1668, rebuilt in 1700, and destroyed in an accidental fire 1711.
 , a 60-gun fourth rate launched in 1758 and sunk as a breakwater in 1774.
 , a 74-gun third rate launched in 1779, converted to a prison hulk in 1813, renamed Retribution in 1814, and broken up 1835.
 , a screw-propelled 91-gun second rate launched in 1858, on loan to the Customs Service as a hulk in 1870, and sold 1904.
 The fifth Edgar, launched 1859, was renamed  in 1860.
 , an  launched in 1890 and sold 1921.
 , an aircraft carrier launched in March 1944, renamed Perseus in June, and broken up 1958.
 The eighth Edgar was to have been a 9,000-ton cruiser; projected in 1945, the ship was cancelled in March 1946.

References

Royal Navy ship names